William George Clark (October 1, 1865 – January 18, 1948) was a merchant and political figure in New Brunswick, Canada. He represented York—Sunbury in the House of Commons of Canada from 1935 to 1940 as a Liberal member. Clark was the 19th Lieutenant Governor of New Brunswick from 1940 to 1945.

He was born in Queensbury, New Brunswick. Clark served as a town councillor for Fredericton Town Council from 1917 to 1925 and was mayor from 1925 to 1935.

References 
 

1865 births
1948 deaths
Members of the House of Commons of Canada from New Brunswick
Liberal Party of Canada MPs
Fredericton city councillors
Mayors of Fredericton
Lieutenant Governors of New Brunswick